Sophie Elizabeth Naseem Munro (born 31 August 2001) is an English cricketer who currently plays for Nottinghamshire, The Blaze and Trent Rockets. She plays as a right-arm medium bowler. She previously played for Yorkshire Diamonds in the 2018 Women's Cricket Super League and London Spirit in the 2021 season of The Hundred.

Domestic career
Munro made her county debut in 2017, for Nottinghamshire against Middlesex, in which she took 5/24 from 7.1 overs. She then took 4/28 in her second match the following day against Berkshire, making it 9 wickets across her first weekend playing county cricket. In 2019, Munro was Nottinghamshire's leading wicket-taker (and joint fifth overall) in the 2019 Women's County Championship, with 14 wickets at an average of 17.85. She took six wickets for Nottinghamshire in the 2021 Women's Twenty20 Cup, helping the side win the East Midlands Group of the competition. She took five wickets for the side in the 2022 Women's Twenty20 Cup, as well as hitting her maiden Twenty20 half-century, 59* against Derbyshire.

Munro was also part of Yorkshire Diamonds's squad in the 2018 Women's Cricket Super League. She played one match, against Loughborough Lightning, but did not bat or bowl.

In 2020, Munro played for Lightning in the Rachael Heyhoe Flint Trophy. She appeared in five matches, taking 4 wickets with a best of 3/32 in the side's first match against North West Thunder. In 2021, she took six wickets at an average of 29.66 for the side in the Rachael Heyhoe Flint Trophy, as well as a further six wickets in the Charlotte Edwards Cup. She also played five matches for London Spirit in The Hundred, taking three wickets at an average of 37.00. She played eleven matches for Lightning in 2022, across the Charlotte Edwards Cup and the Rachael Heyhoe Flint Trophy, taking six wickets. She also hit her maiden List A half-century, scoring 50 against North West Thunder in the Rachael Heyhoe Flint Trophy. In The Hundred, Munro moved to Trent Rockets, playing four matches. In November 2022, it was confirmed that Munro had signed a professional contract with Lightning, now known as The Blaze.

References

External links

2001 births
Living people
Cricketers from Lincoln, England
Nottinghamshire women cricketers
Yorkshire Diamonds cricketers
The Blaze women's cricketers
London Spirit cricketers
Trent Rockets cricketers